Dmitri Alexandrovich Kudryashov (born 13 May 1983) is a Russian football coach and a former player. He is an assistant coach with FC Noah.

Club career
He made his Russian Premier League debut for FC Spartak Moscow on 8 March 2002 in a game against FC Rostselmash Rostov-on-Don.

References

External links
  Player page on the official FC Shinnik Yaroslavl website
 

1983 births
People from Nizhnekamsk
Living people
Russian footballers
Russian expatriate footballers
Russia under-21 international footballers
Association football midfielders
AS Saint-Étienne players
FC Spartak Moscow players
PFC Krylia Sovetov Samara players
FC Anzhi Makhachkala players
FC Daugava players
FC Shinnik Yaroslavl players
FC Luch Vladivostok players
FC Saturn Ramenskoye players
FC Izhevsk players
Russian expatriate sportspeople in France
Russian expatriate sportspeople in Latvia
Expatriate footballers in France
Expatriate footballers in Latvia
Russian Premier League players
FC Nizhny Novgorod (2007) players
FC Volga Nizhny Novgorod players
FC Torpedo Moscow players
FC Spartak-2 Moscow players
Sportspeople from Tatarstan